Nupserha bicolor is a species of beetle in the family Cerambycidae. It was described by James Thomson in 1857.

Varietas
 Nupserha bicolor var. postbrunnea Dutt, 1952
 Nupserha bicolor var. nigrata Breuning, 1950
 Nupserha bicolor var. thomsoni Breuning, 1960
 Nupserha bicolor var. subnitida Breuning, 1960
 Nupserha bicolor var. parteatriventris Breuning, 1960

References

bicolor
Beetles described in 1857